James L. Wright, Jr. (March 10, 1925 – October 16, 1990) was a Republican member of the Pennsylvania House of Representatives. He is a native of New York City. He represented the 142nd legislative district in the Pennsylvania House of Representatives from 1965 to 1990. He is the father of Matthew N. Wright, who succeeded him in representing the 142nd district.

Wright died at a hospice in 1990.

References

Republican Party members of the Pennsylvania House of Representatives
20th-century American politicians
1925 births
1990 deaths